BM Abbas (Died: 1997) was a Bangladeshi water resources expert. He was an advisor on flood control, irrigation and power in the cabinets of Sheikh Mujibur Rahman, Khondaker Mostaq Ahmad and Ziaur Rahman. He was the Minister for Flood Control, Irrigation and Power in Ziaur Rahman Cabinet.

Career 
BM Abbas began his government career in British India. He later worked in the flood control and irrigation departments of Pakistan and independent Bangladesh. He was an advisor on flood control, irrigation and power in the cabinets of Sheikh Mujibur Rahman, Khandaker Mushtaq and Ziaur Rahman. He was the Minister for Flood Control, Irrigation and Power under Ziaur Rahman. He was also the Deputy Prime Minister under President Ershad.

Death 
BM Abbas  died in 1997.

References 

1997 deaths
People from Dinajpur District, Bangladesh
Bangladesh Nationalist Party politicians
Year of birth missing